Ernesto de la Guardia Navarro (May 30, 1904 in Panama City, Panama – May 2, 1983 in Panama City) was president of Panama from October 1, 1956 to October 1, 1960. He belonged to the National Patriotic Coalition (CNP).

Early life and education
Born in Panama City, he was educated at Dartmouth College in the United States, where he obtained a master's degree in finance.

Political career
He began his political career as a consul in the Costa Rican consulate in San Francisco. Prior to his administration, he held diplomatic positions, as well as serving as secretary of state and First Vice President from 1945 to 1948. He was considered a visionary of the Electoral Tribunal and other constitutional reforms, he earned a reputation as a leading advocate for Panamian democracy. During his administration, he was involved in disputes with the United States involving interpretations of the treaties regarding the Panama Canal Zone. On April 26, 1959, he faced an attempted coup planned by diplomat Roberto Arias, nephew of deposed ex-president Arnulfo Arias and husband of famous British ballerina Margot Fonteyn 1.  The coup, allegedly sponsored by Fidel Castro, was suppressed with help from the United States and other American countries.

Personal life
Navarro was married to Mercedes Galindo; they had two sons and a daughter.

Later life and death
After vacating the presidency, he was a member of the Academia Panameña de la Lengua (directing it in 1973 2), and directed the weekly Mundo Gráfico. He died in Panama City in 1983 at the age of 78.

References

External links
Ernesto de la Guardia Short biography 
Ernesto de la Guardia Short biography

1904 births
1983 deaths
People from Panama City
Presidents of Panama
Vice presidents of Panama
National Patriotic Coalition politicians